The 2015 Mount Union Purple Raiders football team was an American football team that represented the University of Mount Union in the Ohio Athletic Conference (OAC) during the 2015 NCAA Division III football season. In their third year under head coach Vince Kehres, the Purple Raiders compiled a perfect 15–0 record, won the OAC championship, advanced to the NCAA Division III playoffs, and defeated , 49–35, in the national championship game.

The team played its home games at Mount Union Stadium in Alliance, Ohio.

Schedule

References

Mount Union
Mount Union Purple Raiders football seasons
NCAA Division III Football Champions
College football undefeated seasons
Mount Union Purple Raiders football